The 1977 Cupa României Final was the 39th final of Romania's most prestigious football cup competition. It was disputed between Universitatea Craiova and Steaua București, and was won by Universitatea Craiova after a game with 3 goals. It was the first cup for Universitatea Craiova.

Match details

See also 
List of Cupa României finals

References

External links
Romaniansoccer.ro

1977
Cupa
Romania
FC Steaua București matches
CS Universitatea Craiova matches